Georges Lutz (3 November 1884 – 31 January 1915) was a French cyclist. He competed in two events at the 1908 Summer Olympics. He was killed in action during World War I.

See also
 List of Olympians killed in World War I

References

External links
 

1884 births
1915 deaths
French male cyclists
Olympic cyclists of France
Cyclists at the 1908 Summer Olympics
Cyclists from Paris
French military personnel killed in World War I